This is a list of Nobel laureates who are Poles (ethnic) or Polish (citizenship). The Nobel Prize is a set of annual international awards bestowed on "those who conferred the greatest benefit on humankind", first instituted in 1901. Since 1903, there have been eighteen Poles who were awarded nineteen Nobel Prizes. Poles have been the recipients in all award categories: Physics, Chemistry, Physiology or Medicine, Literature, Peace and Economics.

Laureates

See also 
 List of Nobel laureates
 List of Nobel laureates by country

References 

Nobel laureates
Polish